Warneton is a village of Wallonia and a district of the municipality of Comines-Warneton, located in the province of Hainaut, Belgium. 

It was a municipality of its own until the 1977 merger of Belgian municipalities.

It is immediately to the north of the French commune of Warneton, across the river Lys or Leie.

The hamlet of Gheer is on its territory.

Etymology 
 1007 Uuarnasthun
 1065 Uuarnestun
 1104 Guarnestun
 1168 Warnestun

Farm (Saxon thun, Germanic *tûna, "enclosure") of Warin, a Saxon and Frankish anthroponym (Saxon settlement set up in the Merovingian era).

History 
Cut away from Ploegsteert in 1850, it was transferred from the province of West Flanders to the province of Hainaut, in 1963. Since that date its minority Dutch-speaking inhabitants have benefitted from language facilities.

References

External links 
 Brief description of the village

Former municipalities of Hainaut (province)
Comines-Warneton